Cossonus divisus, is a species of weevil found in Sri Lanka.

Description
Typical length of the adult is about 3.5 to 4.0 mm. Body shiny black. Elytra reddish brown, where the suture and the apex are narrowly black. The inflexed margins are dark brown. Rostral apex, legs and antennae are reddish brown. Antennal club is fuscous. There is a deep oval frontal fovea in the head. Prothorax with the median impression more or less interrupted in the middle. Elytra slightly flat and much less steeply declivous behind. In the ventrum, the punctures in the middle of the venter are distinctly larger than those on the metasternum. Punctures on the mesosternal process are larger and closer.

References 

Curculionidae
Insects of Sri Lanka
Insects described in 1938